TableTop is a web series about games, directed by Jennifer Arnold. It was created by Wil Wheaton and Felicia Day and was hosted by Wheaton. TableTop was published on Felicia Day's YouTube channel, Geek & Sundry. In each episode, following a brief explanation of one or more tabletop games, Wheaton plays the games with one or more guests—usually web or TV personalities.

A wide range of hobby gaming titles have been played, from classic German-style board games and family games to RPGs and card games. It has been described as "like Celebrity Poker meets Dinner for Five, where interesting people got together for tabletop games."

After two seasons, the show announced that its third season would be crowdfunded via Indiegogo, and was the most successful digital series campaign on that site until Con Man broke its record in March 2015. The series ended in 2017.

Episodes

Season 1 (2012–13)

Season 2 (2013–14)

Season 3 (2014–15)

Season 4 (2016–17)
On December 31, 2015, Wil Wheaton announced the fourth season of TableTop would begin production in April 2016. Wheaton estimated early June 2016 for the release of the first episode but did not provide a firm release date. After filming ended in May 2016, Wheaton revised the estimated release to July 2016, but mentioned that he actually has no say over the release date. The list of games was released April 22, 2016 but not the final order or release dates. On July 28, 2016, Wheaton announced that release of season 4 was delayed, saying "Legendary has decided to delay the release of season four until later this year. As soon as we know exactly when it is, I'll make a big old announcement." On October 15, 2016, it was announced on Twitter that Season 4 of TableTop would premiere on November 2, with the first two episodes released on both YouTube and Legendary Digital Networks' subscription streaming service, Alpha, and the rest of the season initially only on Alpha but to be released on YouTube in early 2017. A Reddit comment made by Wheaton on January 13 stated that episodes should be released publicly on YouTube starting the week of January 30.
Geek and Sundry announced via their Facebook page on January 31 that episodes would begin streaming on YouTube the next day, February 1.

Funding campaign
On April 5, 2014, Wil Wheaton announced the launch of a campaign on Indiegogo to fund the creation of a third season.  The target amount was $500,000 to produce 15 episodes, with additional targets of $750,000 to produce a full season of 20 episodes, and $1,000,000 to film a spin-off RPG series. The campaign exceeded its goals, eventually closing with $1,414,159.

Impact
Evidence presented by a Canadian online game retailer showed that games featured in TableTop received a boost in sales after the episode aired: this was dubbed "The Wheaton Effect". Game publisher Days of Wonder has said that having titles featured on the show had significant boost on sales.

After the game Tsuro was featured, demand was so high that the publisher exhausted all stock reserves. The game was, for a time, unavailable in Europe as production tried to cope with US demand.

In 2013, the web series won the Diana Jones Award, citing that "TableTop has brought a new energy and humour to the board-game field: its blend of good humour and gameplay is pitch-perfect and has introduced a range of titles from modern classics to indie RPGs to thousands of new players."

TableTop won the gold ENnie for Best Podcast at the 2013 Gen Con EN World RPG Awards for its Dragon Age episodes. The award was accepted by Chris Pramas on behalf of Wil Wheaton.

TableTop won the Origins Award for "Best Game-Related Publication of 2013".

The Doubleclicks wrote a song about TableTop, featured on their 2014 album Dimetrodon

International TableTop Day
The first International TableTop Day, founded by Boyan Radakovich, was held on March 30, 2013 and was live-streamed on the Geek & Sundry channel on YouTube. Games included Takenoko, Ticket to Ride, 7 Wonders, Smash Up, and Star Trek Catan; with several of the first season guests returning to play. It aired in two segments hosted by Felicia Day and Wil Wheaton, with an extra wrap-up segment uploaded later. Events were held in 64 countries.

The second International TableTop Day was held on April 5, 2014. The event was again live-streamed on YouTube, and the games shown were KrosMaster: Arena, Tanto Cuore, Rampage, and Love Letter. Events were held in over 80 countries.

The third International TableTop Day was held on April 11, 2015.

The fourth installment took place on April 30, 2016.

The fifth International TableTop Day took place on April 29, 2017, and the games shown were King of Tokyo, Rhino Hero, Fuse, Dread Draw, Codenames, Dread RPG, Tsuro, Attack on Titan and Dark Souls.

The sixth International TableTop Day took place on April 28, 2018, and the games shown were The Climbers, Grimm Forest, Flip Ships, World Wide Wrestling, and Marvel Contest of Champions – Battlerealm.

The seventh International Tabletop Day took place on June 1, 2019.

References

External links 
 
 
 

2012 web series debuts
Crowdfunded web series
American non-fiction web series
Origins Award winners
2010s YouTube series